Szolnok County was a county in the Kingdom of Hungary between the 11th century and 1426.

Kingdom of Hungary counties in Transylvania